Uthumphon Phisai railway station is a railway station located in Kamphaeng Subdistrict, Uthumphon Phisai District, Sisaket Province.

References 

Railway stations in Thailand
Sisaket province